Oregon's 14th Senate district comprises parts of Washington and Multnomah counties, including most of Beaverton and Aloha and adjoining communities. It is currently represented by Democrat Kate Lieber.

Election results
District boundaries have changed over time, therefore, senators before 2013 may not represent the same constituency as today. From 1993 until 2003, the district covered parts of Clackamas County, and from 2003 until 2013 it covered a slightly different area in Washington County.

References

14
Multnomah County, Oregon
Washington County, Oregon